Canada Forum for Nepal, also known as CFFN or CFFN.ca, is a not–for–profit organization registered with the Government of Canada. According to its official website, CFFN is an organization of the Nepalese Diaspora and Friends of Nepal aspiring to see a peaceful, democratic, just, and prosperous Nepal. Established in January 2006 at Ottawa, Canada, it was a culmination of efforts by those individuals who were weighing on various alternatives to help the people of Nepal.

The CFFN states to have simple objectives: raising awareness about Nepal in Canada; incubating research in Canada on solutions to Nepal's economic, social, and political issues; promoting cooperation between the grassroots people of Canada and Nepal for promoting collaborative development and international peace.

Activities
Since its inception CFFN has made significant amount of contribution towards the movement for peace, justice, and democracy in Nepal. In January 2006, CFFN initiated organized activities in support of the democratic movement of Nepal. Since then, some of the accomplishments of the organization are: submission of human rights complaints in the UN; petition campaign for peace and democracy and its submission to the UN and the Government of Canada; panel discussions with Nepal experts and Hon. Flora MacDonald – former Minister of Foreign Affairs. Besides, CFFN also raised fund for the victims during the popular uprising of 2006, provided radio interviews, organized a number of interaction programs and deliberated in conferences on contemporary issues of Nepal, and also brought academic thoughts on issues of Nepal through its newsletter "Concern Nepal" and other publications.

After the 2006 Nepalese revolution, the organization shifted its focus more on research, knowledge, education of children, and raising awareness about Nepal in Canada. It organized "Himalayan Heartbeat" with renowned mountaineer Andrew Brash as a keynote speaker in 2006. And it organized the second annual Himalayan Heartbeat program with some of the most prominent living personalities in Nepal. Hon. Marion Dewar, the former Mayor of Ottawa, was the chief guest.

CFFN is organized a series of interaction programs throughout 2006 and 2007. The first prominent program was held in February 2006 with a panel of Nepal experts and Hon. Flora MacDonald, the former Foreign Minister of Canada. The latest and largest conference organized by CFFN was academic conference titled "Unfolding Futures: Nepalese Economy, Society and Politics" on 5–7 October 2007 in Ottawa, Canada. This conference was addressed by Dr. Ronald Watts, a notable authority on federalism and the former Vice-Chancellor of Queen's University.

The CFFN promotes critical thinking and scholarly exchanges between Canada and Nepal. In particular, the organization likes to position itself as a bridge between the Canadian public who are concerned about global issues and the most disadvantaged children, women and men of Nepal who are deprived of basic education, knowledge, and capacity required for overcoming poverty and for inculcating innovation and progress. This stance comes from a conviction that knowledge and education is the most profound requirement for building a just and prosperous Nepal.

CFFN provides individuals of all ages, talents and abilities the opportunities to contribute in worthy endeavors that benefit both Nepal and Canada. Its programs stem from an awareness towards the needs of individuals, families, nations, and the world as a whole.

See also

Nepal

External links

Diaspora organizations in Canada
Nepalese Canadian